The Sechelt language, Sháshíshálh or Shashishalhem, is a Coast Salish language spoken by the Shishalh (Sechelt) people of the Pacific Northwest Coast. It is spoken in the area now called southwestern British Columbia, Canada, centred on their reserve communities in the Sechelt Peninsula area of the Sunshine Coast.

In 1999, the language was spoken by fewer than 40 elderly people. A grammar of the language by linguist Ron Beaumont was published in 1985, based on the Sechelt language course he helped design for local high schools participating in the Native Environmental Studies Program.

They now only have 4 elderly/fluent speakers, but have many teachers that teach children from preschool all the way through high school. UBC, Vancouver and Okanagan offers language courses, that give students the opportunity to learn various languages, Shashishalhem being one of the few

In 2014, the Coastal Corridor Consortium, "an entity made up of board members from First Nations and educational partners to improve aboriginal access to and performance in postsecondary education and training", created a Sechelt Nation language certificate.

Sechelt is most closely related to Squamish, Halkomelem, and the Nooksack.

Although critically endangered, the Sechelt people, with help from others, have reclaimed 603 phrases and 5659 words in total and have a published dictionary and grammar.

Phonology

Consonants
For those IPA symbols that do not match their orthographic counterparts the orthographic representation is in brackets. This is based on the alphabet created by Randy Bouchard in 1977.

Vowels 

The four vowels have numerous allophones when in certain phonetic contexts.

When the /i/ is between voiced back consonants and /ʔ/ it is realized as [e], while when it is between two other consonants it is realized as [i]. If it is between a combination of the two groups it is realized as a vowel in between [i] and [e], usually closer to [e]. The vowel is also realized as [e] when the syllable is unstressed.

The /ə/ is realized as [ɪ] when after ⟨y, ch, ch', sh, k, k'⟩. After consonants with lip rounding it is realized as [ʊ], and after ⟨h, k, k', m, p', t', tl', x, ʔ⟩ it is realized as [ʌ]. When /ə/ is in an unstressed syllable between two voiceless consonants it is also voiceless.

The /o/ is realized as a [u] when preceded or followed by a consonant with lip rounding.

The /a/ is realized as [ɒ] when preceded by a consonant with lip rounding and realized as [æ] after the consonants ⟨y, ch, ch', sh, k, k'⟩.

The vowels may also be subject for lengthening, but this is purely for rhetorical purposes.The longer a vowel is held, the more emphatic or dramatic the intended meaning is.

Stress and Syllable Structure 
All Sechelt words have at least one stressed syllable, but some words have stress on every syllable. This gives the language its characteristic "choppy" cadence.

In Sechelt no word can start with a vowel and there can never be two vowel sounds in a row. The glottal stop is used at the beginning of all words that do not start with any other consonant. The glottal stop is also often inserted between the two vowels at the end of a word root and beginning of a suffix. Another solution for these two vowels in a row is the deletion of whichever one is unstressed.

Morphology 
Like other members of the Salish language family, Sechelt is agglutinative with affixes added to nouns and verbs. 

For verbs, suffixes are added to mark the subject and tense, as well as to make the statement a question or add adverbial information. All pronouns in Sechelt are suffixes, while adverbs may be suffixes or their own word that comes before the verb and can take on suffixes of its own. This can be examplified by two different wordings of the question “Were you afraid?”, with the first one emphasizing the word “afraid” and the second emphasizing that it happened in the past. 

ch’ásxém            -ulh                           -á                 -chexw?

afraid-     completion marker-   question marker-        you?

ku                             -á                 -chexw   ch’asxém?

past tense marker-   question marker-      you       afraid?

For nouns and verbs, lexical markers are used to convey related meanings. This can be seen in variations on the verb "ts'exw" meaning “get clean/washed”: 

For nouns, possessive markers are suffixes when the owner is third-person singular or second-person plural

Infixes 
Commonly in Sechelt there is no suffix on the verb to convey that the subject is third person singular or plural, but if the speaker would like to emphasize that the subject is plural they may add “áw” or “íw” sounds in the middle of the verb or add “aw” after the verb. 

p’áp’ats’-em     =                     he/she is sewing                     ‘é’ílhten           =              he/she is eating

p’áp’ats’(-aw)-em      =            they are sewing                      ‘é’ílhíwten        =              they are eating

Syntax

Word Order 
Sechelt has a Verb-Subject-Object word order, with only select adverbs able to go before the verb in a sentence. The verb can be transitive and intransitive, and there is no case marking on the subject or object to indicate the role in a sentence. The word order conveys this information, and only certain verbs can be transitive, and often an ending is changed or added to make the verb transitive.

For example, the word “kánám” means “to listen” while the word “kánám-mít” means “to listen to/hear.” You can see this below in this sentence that illustrates the word order.

See also
Shishalh
Sechelt, British Columbia

References

External links
First Nations Languages of British Columbia Sechelt page
OLAC resources in and about the Sechelt language

Coast Salish languages
Indigenous languages of the Pacific Northwest Coast
First Nations languages in Canada
Critically endangered languages
Shishalh